Taurus Musik is a pan African record label founded by  Ikechukwu Arthur Anoke in 2012 as its flagship label. Taurus Musik dabbles in artist management that includes PR, music release, promotion and execution for big wigs in the African Music Scene including Lady Jaydee, Alicios Theluji, Kagwe Mungai, Gin Ideal, Trina Mungai, Urban Hype, Ivlyn Mutua and Tallie.

History
Taurus Musik started has over the years been responsible for the growth of Artists in the East African region. One of such artists is Atemi Oyungu under which she released her hit single with Sauti Sol.

Taurus Musik has been responsible for housing artists including Ivlyn Mutua, Trina Mungai, Tallie 254, Kagwe Mungai, Gin Ideal
Urban Hype

References

African record labels
Record labels established in 2012
Pop record labels